David Copperfield is a 10 episode BBC serial broadcast in 1986 and 1987 and based on the 1850 novel David Copperfield by Charles Dickens. The series was written by James Andrew Hall and directed by Barry Letts. It was produced by Terrance Dicks.

The adaptation follows the story of David Copperfield as he grows up under the care of the cruel Murdstones after the death of his mother, escapes to the care of his aunt Betsey Trotwood and later travels to London where he meets the gentle Micawbers and the scheming Uriah Heep, and falls in love with and marries the spoilt Dora Spenlow.

The series was nominated for a BAFTA in the Children's Programme (Entertainment/Drama) 1986 category.

Scenes from the series were filmed at Holme-next-the-Sea in Norfolk.

The English DVD release with the original ten episode format has become almost impossible to find, with only the Dutch import that edited the episodes together to make it only five parts being available.

Plot
For a detailed plot, see David Copperfield (novel).

Cast
 Colin Hurley -- David Copperfield 
 Brenda Bruce -- Betsey Trotwood
 Simon Callow -- Wilkins Micawber
 Jeremy Brudenell -- James Steerforth
 Francesca Hall  -- Dora Spenlow/Clara Copperfield
 Jenny McCracken—Clara Peggotty
 Ronald Herdman—Barkis 
 Hilary Mason—Mrs. Gummidge 
 Natalie Ogle -- Agnes Wickfield
 Owen Teale—Ham Peggotty 
 Stephen Thorne—Daniel Peggotty
 Thorley Walters --  Mr. Dick
 Paul Brightwell -- Uriah Heep
 Oliver Cotton -- Edward Murdstone
 Sandra Payne—Emma Micawber 
 Irene Richard—Julia Mills 
 Neal Swettenham—Thomas Traddles 
 Fanny Carby—Mrs. Crupp 
 Sarah Crowden—Jane Murdstone 
 David Dexter—Young David 
 Valerie Gogan—Emily 
 Nolan Hemmings—Young David 
 Terence Lodge—Francis Spenlow 
 Nyree Dawn Porter—Mrs. Steerforth 
 John Baker—Tiffey 
 Nicholas Bond-Owen—1st Boy 
 Chris Chandler—2nd Boy 
 Dylan Dolan—Young Traddles 
 Leon Eagles—Mr. Sharp 
 Alison Fiske—Rosa Dartle 
 Jonathan Lacey—Demple 
 Artro Morris—Mr. Wickfield 
 Reggie Oliver—Mr. Mell 
 John Savident—Mr. Creakle 
 Ann Way—Mrs. Heep

References

External links

David Copperfield on the British Film Institute website
David Copperfield on the PBS 'Masterpiece Theatre' website

BBC television dramas
Television series set in the 1850s
1986 British television series debuts
1987 British television series endings
1980s British drama television series
Television shows based on David Copperfield